Forcipiger wanai, the Cenderawasih longnose butterflyfish, is a species of marine ray-finned fish, a butterflyfish  from the family Chaetodontidae. It is endemic to Cenderawasih Bay in the Bird's Head Peninsula region of West Papua.

References

Fish described in 2012
Taxa named by Gerald R. Allen
Taxa named by Mark van Nydeck Erdmann
wanai